These are the official results of the Men's 4x400 metres event at the 1993 IAAF World Championships in Stuttgart, Germany. There were a total number of eighteen participating nations, with three qualifying heats and the final held on Sunday, August 22, 1993.  The current world record for the event was set in the final.

Final

Qualifying heats
Held on Saturday 1993-08-21

Heat 1

Heat 2

Heat 3

See also
 1988 Men's Olympic 4 × 400 m Relay (Seoul)
 1990 Men's European Championships 4 × 400 m Relay (Split)
 1991 Men's World Championships 4 × 400 m Relay (Tokyo)
 1992 Men's Olympic 4 × 400 m Relay (Barcelona)
 1994 Men's European Championships 4 × 400 m Relay (Helsinki)
 1995 Men's World Championships 4 × 400 m Relay (Gothenburg)

References
 Results

 
Relays at the World Athletics Championships